Marcus Mehnert (born 28 October 1997) is a Norwegian football striker who currently plays for Norwegian First Division side Ranheim Fotball.

Club career
He started his youth career in Hvalstad IL, then Holmen IF, but joined Stabæk in 2011. He progressed to the junior team and attended the Norwegian College of Elite Sports, attending the class of 2016 together with Andreas Hanche-Olsen, Cornelius Bencsik, Marius Østvold, Edvard Linnebo Race and Marie Dølvik Markussen among others.

He was drafted into the senior squad ahead of the 2016 season under new head coach Billy McKinlay, and made his league debut in March 2016 against Aalesund, starting the game. After half a season he went on to third-tier club Asker.

Career statistics

Club

References

1997 births
Living people
People from Asker
Norwegian footballers
Association football forwards
Stabæk Fotball players
Asker Fotball players
SK Brann players
Nest-Sotra Fotball players
Eliteserien players
Norwegian First Division players
Norwegian Second Division players
Sportspeople from Viken (county)